In British parliamentary procedure, a humble address is a communication from one of the houses of the Parliament of the United Kingdom to the monarch.  For example, following the speech from the throne opening a session of parliament, each house will debate the contents of the speech under a motion for a humble address thanking the King for the speech.

Address for a return 
In the United Kingdom, a humble address for a return is a rarely used parliamentary procedure by which either the House of Commons or House of Lords may petition the monarch, and by extension HM Government, to order documents to be produced. Erskine May notes that this power was used frequently until the mid-19th century, though most such information is now provided by command papers or the explanatory documents attached to Acts of Parliament.

1866 
In 1866, as part of a campaign to extend the electoral franchise to women, John Stuart Mill moved an address for a "Return of the number of Freeholders, Householders, and others in England and Wales who, fulfilling the conditions of property or rental prescribed by Law as the qualification for the Electoral Franchise, are excluded from the Franchise by reason of their sex" in order to debate the petition he had presented. The government of the day accepted the motion, but may not have provided the information specifically requested.

2017
In 2017, the House of Commons voted to issue a humble address to request the government to reveal documents about the potential impact of Brexit on the British economy. The motion, put forward by the opposition, requested:

The Daily Telegraph reported that the Queen was not happy at being drawn into a political issue, which the monarch, by convention, avoids.

2018
A second Brexit-related humble address was placed before the House on 13 November 2018, seeking the release of legal advice given to the government regarding the proposed EU withdrawal agreement:

The government's response was presented to Parliament by the Attorney General, Geoffrey Cox, on 3 December. However, the following day, it was deemed by MPs to be incomplete, which led to a vote in which, for the first time in history, the Government of the United Kingdom was found to be in contempt of Parliament.

2019
Former Conservative Party Attorney General Dominic Grieve laid a third Brexit-related humble address before the House on 9 September 2019; requiring the publication of documents related to no-deal Brexit (Operation Yellowhammer) and to the prorogation of Parliament scheduled for later that day, it was passed by 311 votes to 302. The motion provided as follows:

2022
Opposition leader Keir Starmer tabled a humble address requesting information relating to the peerage of Evgeny Lebedev. The peerage had been appointed against the advice of the House of Lords Appointments Commission. This was the first time that a peerage had been appointed against advice given by the commission. The prime minister is the only person with veto over peerages.

See also 
 Humble Petition and Advice
 Privileged Bodies of the United Kingdom

References 

Parliamentary procedure